The following list contains all major audio and video recordings of Modest Mussorgsky's opera Boris Godunov.

Recordings

1869 version

1872 version

External links
 Operadis-opera-discography.org.uk
 Carlomarinelli.it

Opera discographies
Operas by Modest Mussorgsky